Ricardo Aquilino Viveros Farías (born 5 October 1978) is a Chilean former footballer who played as a forward and left-back for clubs in Chile and Sweden.

Playing career
As a youth player, Viveros was with club Cerro Porteño from Quillón and Huachipato. He began his career as a forward, but he turned into a left-back. In the Chilean Primera División, he played for Huachipato, Unión San Felipe, Deportes Puerto Montt and Deportes Concepción. 

In his homeland, he also played for Universidad San Sebastián, Magallanes, Unión La Calera, Naval and Lota Schwager. As a member of Unión La Calera, he won the league title of the Tercera División in 2000.

In second half 2007, he moved to Sweden and joined IFK Norrköping in the Superettan. After suffering a serious injury, he returned to Chile in 2008.

In 2009, he returned to Sweden and went on his career at low categories playing for Chile Unido, Norrköping Bosna, Azech SF, Kimstad GoIF and FF Jaguar.

Coaching career
He has worked for the IFK Norrköping youth system as fitness coach and assistant.

Personal life
His son, Ricky, took part of the IFK Norrköping youth ranks.

Despite Viveros made his home in Sweden, he has a closeness with his city of birth, Quillón, also performing as an experience teller for the municipality.

Honours
Unión La Calera
 Tercera División de Chile:

References

External links
 
 

1978 births
Living people
People from Diguillín Province
Chilean footballers
Chilean expatriate footballers
Chilean Primera División players
C.D. Huachipato footballers
Unión San Felipe footballers
Puerto Montt footballers
Deportes Concepción (Chile) footballers
Primera B de Chile players
Tercera División de Chile players
Deportes Magallanes footballers
Magallanes footballers
Unión La Calera footballers
Naval de Talcahuano footballers
Lota Schwager footballers
Superettan players
Allsvenskan players
IFK Norrköping players
Chilean expatriate sportspeople in Sweden
Expatriate footballers in Sweden
Association football defenders
Chilean football managers
Chilean expatriate football managers
Expatriate football managers in Sweden